Amigomío is a 1994  Argentine film directed by Alcides Chiesa and Jeanine Meerapfel. Script written by Alcides Chiesa it was based on a novel by Pablo Bergel. The film was produced in a co-production with Germany. Mario Adorf appears as the grandfather of the young boy.

Cast
Mario Adorf ....  Grandfather
Daniel Kuzniecka ....  Papa
Diego Mesaglio ....  Amigomio
Debora Brandwajnman ....  Grandmother
Atilio Veronelli ....  Tony
Manuel Tricallotis
Christoph Baumann ....  Christoph
Hugo Pozo
Gabriela Salas ....  Negra
Rodolfo Rodas
Pablo Jully
Ernesto Arias
Luis Solanas
Marcos Woinsky
Eduardo Narvay

External links

1994 films
Argentine drama films
German drama films
Indigenous cinema in Latin America
1990s Spanish-language films
Quechua-language films
Aymara-language films
1990s German-language films
Films set in South America
Films directed by Jeanine Meerapfel
1990s Argentine films
1990s German films